Charles Schwartz Jr. (August 20, 1922 – November 3, 2012) was a United States district judge of the United States District Court for the Eastern District of Louisiana.

Education and career

Born in New Orleans, Louisiana, Schwartz received a Bachelor of Arts degree from Tulane University in 1943 and was in the United States Army as a Second Lieutenant from 1943 to 1945, remaining in the United States Army Reserve from 1946 to 1965 and attaining the rank of Major. He received a Juris Doctor from Tulane University Law School in 1947, and was then in private practice in New Orleans until 1976. He was a district counsel for the Gulf Coast District of the United States Maritime Administration from 1953 to 1962.

Federal judicial service

On March 23, 1976, Schwartz was nominated by President Gerald Ford to a seat on the United States District Court for the Eastern District of Louisiana vacated by Judge Herbert William Christenberry. Schwartz was confirmed by the United States Senate on May 6, 1976, and received his commission on May 7, 1976. He assumed senior status on February 28, 1991. Concurrent to his federal judicial service, he taught as an adjunct professor of law at Tulane University, starting in 1977. Schwartz died on November 3, 2012, in Metairie, Louisiana.

See also
List of Jewish American jurists

References

Sources
 

1922 births
2012 deaths
Judges of the United States District Court for the Eastern District of Louisiana
United States district court judges appointed by Gerald Ford
20th-century American judges
Tulane University alumni
Tulane University Law School alumni
Tulane University faculty
Tulane University Law School faculty
United States Army officers
United States Army reservists
Judges of the United States Foreign Intelligence Surveillance Court
United States Army personnel of World War II